The Prairie Dog Creek Bridge, near Orleans, Nebraska, is a historic Camelback pony truss bridge that was built in 1913.  It was designed and built by Monarch Engineering Co., with its steel was fabricated by Jones & Laughlin Steel Co.  Also designated as NEHBS No. HN00-53, it was listed on the National Register of Historic Places in 1992.

The bridge is a single rigid-connected Camelback pony truss and has carried vehicular traffic since 1913.

References

External links 

More photos of the Prairie Dog Creek Bridge at Wikimedia Commons

Road bridges on the National Register of Historic Places in Nebraska
Bridges completed in 1913
1913 establishments in Nebraska
National Register of Historic Places in Harlan County, Nebraska
Steel bridges in the United States
Buildings and structures in Harlan County, Nebraska